Aethalopteryx gyldenstolpei is a moth in the family Cossidae. It is found in the Democratic Republic of the Congo.

References

Moths described in 1925
Aethalopteryx